Darryl Hendricks (born 21 August 1989) is a South African cricketer. He made his first-class debut for Boland in the 2017–18 Sunfoil 3-Day Cup on 11 January 2018.

References

External links
 

1989 births
Living people
South African cricketers
Boland cricketers
Place of birth missing (living people)